Ocean View, Cape Town, was established in 1968 as a township for coloured people who had been forcibly removed from so called "white areas" such as Simon's Town, Noordhoek, Red Hill, Glencairn by the apartheid government under the Group Areas Act. It was first called Slangkop, and the first resident moved there on 1 August 1968. It was renamed Ocean View, although the government had removed the residents from their previous seaside homes and views. As a result, its history is embedded in apartheid, and there is still bitter resentment among many people there.

It is located between the community of Kommetjie to its west and Imhof's Gift and Masiphumelele to its east.

Notable residents 
 Peter Clarke – visual artist
Emile Baron – international footballer / Bafana Bafana goalkeeper
Franklin Cale – professional footballer / Bafana Bafana

References

Suburbs of Cape Town